Fuad Olabode Ekelojuoti (born December 1, 1994, in Lagos) is a Nigerian football attacking midfielder currently playing for Sunshine Stars F.C.

Playing career
Ekelojuoti was born in Lagos, and began his professional career with local club Ocean Boys F.C.
On 4 January 2013 left Ocean Boys F.C. and signed with NIgerian Premier League club Kwara United F.C.
Ahead of the 2014 season, Ekelojuoti joined Stationery Stores F.C. on one and half year deal.
July 5, 2015 he signed for Shooting Stars.
He joined First Bank on 3 July 2016, signing a one-year contract.
Ekelojuoti joined Heartland from First Bank in an undisclosed fee after a superb season.
On 20 January 2019 was one of thirteen players, who signed for Sunshine Stars F.C.

Notes

External links
 

1994 births
Living people
Nigerian footballers
Heartland F.C. players
Sunshine Stars F.C. players
Sportspeople from Lagos
Shooting Stars S.C. players
First Bank F.C. players
Association football midfielders
21st-century Nigerian people